Mariam Veiszadeh is an Afghan-born Australian lawyer and writer known for her anti-racism campaigns.

Early life and education
Veiszadeh was born in Kabul, Afghanistan in 1984. In 1988, when Veiszadeh was four years old, her family fled Afghanistan during the Soviet–Afghan War. Her family arrived in Australia in 1944 via India, the Czech Republic, and Germany, and were granted asylum in 1991 under the Refugee and Special Humanitarian Program.

Veiszadeh earned a dual Bachelor of Laws and Bachelor Economics degree from Western Sydney University.

Advocacy 
She is the founder and former president of Islamophobia Register Australia, which describes itself as "a secure and reliable service that allows people from across Australia to report any form of Anti-Muslim abuse", and an official Ambassador for Welcome to Australia and Participate Australia. 

Veiszadeh sits on the board of  Our Watch, a national organisation established to drive nationwide change in the culture, behaviours and power imbalances that lead to violence against women and their children.

A member of the Australian Muslim community, she has been described as a "typically assertive Australian woman" by ABC News.

Recognition
Veiszadeh was named 2016 Fairfax Daily Life Woman of the Year and was selected by Elle Magazine Malaysia as one of 12 women who were helping to "change the world" for International Women's Day 2015, alongside Michelle Obama and Angelina Jolie.

In Australia, GetUp!, an independent community advocacy organisation, featured her with Rosie Batty, 2015 Australian of the Year, for ‘making it happen’. Veiszadeh was also featured in Elle Magazine Australia for their #WeAreWomen campaign  and was a finalist in the Daily Life Women of the Year Awards as well as being awarded Westpac’s ‘Woman of Influence’ Award in 2015.

In December 2015, Veiszadeh was awarded the “Role Model of the Year” and “Woman of the Year” at the 9th Australian Muslim Achievement Awards.

Trolling campaign
Veiszadeh became a victim of Joshua Ryne Goldberg, who was later convicted by the U.S. Government of attempting a bombing on the 14th anniversary of 9/11. Goldberg posted to The Daily Stormer, a neo-Nazi website, under the pseudonym "Michael Slay", and contributed to feminist blog Feministing under the pseudonym "Tanya Cohen".

He promoted an illusory friendship between Australi Witness (his pro-ISIL Twitter account) and Veiszadeh, with the objective of smearing Veiszadeh's reputation. Under the name "Michael Slay", Goldberg wrote the majority of articles on The Daily Stormer criticising Veiszadeh, including the initial piece criticising her stance on a shirt, sold by Woolworths, that read 'If You Don't Love It Leave'. Upon learning the true identity of the writer, website owner Andrew Anglin removed all content by Goldberg.

References

Australian Muslim activists
Australian women lawyers
Living people
Afghan refugees
Afghan emigrants to Australia
People from Kabul
1984 births
Naturalised citizens of Australia
Western Sydney University alumni